Anttila may refer to:

Geography 
 Anttila (Kouvola), a village in Kouvola, Finland
 Anttila (Lohja), a district in Lohja, Finland
 Anttila (Porvoo), a village in Porvoo, Finland
 Anttila (Rauma, Finland), a district in Rauma, Finland

Surname 
 Anttila (surname)

Other 
 , a Finnish chain of department stores owned by Kesko from 1996 to 2015

See also 
 Hämeen-Anttila